Zan or ZAN, may refer to:

Geography
 Zhan, Kurdistan, Iran, also known as Zān
 Zhan, Lorestan, Iran, also known as Žān
 Zan, Tehran, a village in Tehran Province, Iran
 Zan, a town in Lebanon, also known as Zane

Ethnicity and language
 Zans, the Zan People, people who speak the Zan languages
 Zan Gula language, an Adamawa language of Chad
 Zan language, a proposed collective term for the Megrelian and Laz languages in 7th Century Caucasus

People
 Zan, a soca singer winner of International Soca Monarch in Trinidad in 2006

Given name
 Zan Abeyratne, backing singer in Models
 Žan Benedičič (born 1994) Slovenian soccer player
 Žan Celar (born 1999) Slovenian soccer player
 Zan Ganassa (1540–1584) Italian actor
 Zan Wesley Holmes Jr, U.S. minister
 Žan Jakše, Slovenian canoeist
 Žan Kranjec (born 1992) Slovenian alpine skier
 Žan Marolt (1964–2009) Bosnia-Herzegovina actor
 Zan Perrion, Canadian pickup artist, founder of the Ars Amorata philosophy
 Zan Rowe (born 1978) Australian radio personality
 Žan Tabak (born 1970) Canadian basketball player

Surname
 Alessandro Zan (born 1973) Italian politician
 Gökhan Zan (born 1981) Turkish footballer
 Zinny J. Zan of Zan Clan
Zan (surname), Chinese surname (昝)

Fictional characters
 Zan, the eagle in Guardians of Ga'Hoole
 Zan, the main character in the video game Rising Zan: The Samurai Gunman
 Zan, the male Wonder Twin in the American animated Hanna-Barbera TV series Super Friends
 Zan Owlson, the female acting CEO of Glomgold Industries in the 2017 reboot of DuckTales
 Zan Partizane, one of the characters in Kirby Star Allies

Media
 Zan (newspaper), an Iranian newspaper
 Zan TV, Afghan women's TV station

Music
 Zan (Shohreh Solati album), a critically acclaimed album by Shohreh Solati
 "Zan", a 1999 song by Japanese rock band Dir En Grey on Gauze
 "Zan", song by Gackt released as "Setsugekka (The End of Silence)"/"Zan" in 2009

Video games
 Zan: Yasha Enbukyoku
 Zan II: Spirits

Other uses
 Zan (簪), the Chinese name for hairpins, called Kanzashi in Japan

Acronyms and codes
 Zanzibar, a part of Tanzania, East Africa
 Anchorage Air Route Traffic Control Center in Alaska (identifier)
 Zantop International Airlines, United States (ICAO code)

See also
 Zan Zan (Hangul: 짠짠) K-Pop band

English unisex given names
Unisex given names
Chinese given names
Hypocorisms
Nicknames